A Living Statue (Italian: La statua vivente) is a 1943 Italian drama film directed by Camillo Mastrocinque and starring Laura Solari, Fosco Giachetti and Camillo Pilotto.

The film's sets were designed by the art director Cesare Pavani. It was shot at the Farnesina Studios of Titanus in Rome.

Cast
 Laura Solari as Luisa / Rita 
 Fosco Giachetti as Paolo Vieri 
 Camillo Pilotto as Cesare Parodi 
 Lauro Gazzolo as Raffaele 
 Dhia Cristiani as Irma 
 Amina Pirani Maggi as Madre di Irma 
 Olga Solbelli as La padrona della taverna 
 Guido Celano as L'amante di Rita 
 Renato Malavasi as Un invitato alla festa 
 Pina Renzi
 Checco Rissone
 Lora Silvani
 Ciro Berardi 
 Pietro Bigerna
 Angelo Cecchelin
 Carlo Dale
 Enrico Luzi

References

Bibliography
 Gundle, Stephen. Mussolini's Dream Factory: Film Stardom in Fascist Italy. Berghahn Books, 2013.

External links

1943 films
1940s Italian-language films
1943 drama films
Italian black-and-white films
Films directed by Camillo Mastrocinque
Italian drama films
Films scored by Alessandro Cicognini
1940s Italian films